The Island that Dared: Journeys in Cuba is a book by Irish author Dervla Murphy. It was first published by Eland Books in 2008.

Summary
The Island that Dared describes the three journeys of Murphy to Cuba with her daughter, Rachel, and three grand-daughters, Rose, Clodagh and Zea, in 2005, and returning on her own in 2006 and 2007. 

Murphy's experiences in Havana were later also featured in a collection of traveller's tales.

References

External links
 

2008 non-fiction books
Eland Books books
Books by Dervla Murphy